Shitan Station is a station of Line 8 of the Guangzhou Metro. It is located at Shicha Road, Baiyun District, Guangzhou, Guangdong, China. The station opened on November 26, 2020 with the opening of the northern extension of Line 8.

The station has an underground island platform. Platform 1 is for trains towards Jiaoxin, whilst platform 2 is for trains towards Wanshengwei.
There are 3 exits, lettered B, C and D. Exit B is accessible. All exits are located on Shicha Road.

Gallery

References

Railway stations in China opened in 2020
Guangzhou Metro stations in Baiyun District